Camborne Pendarves was an electoral division of Cornwall in the United Kingdom which returned one member to sit on Cornwall Council between 2013 and 2021. It was abolished at the 2021 local elections, being succeeded by Camborne Trelowarren and Camborne West and Treswithian.

Councillors

Extent
Camborne Pendarves respresented the south of Camborne and the villages of Barripper and Penponds, covering 377 hectares in total.

Election results

2017 election

2015 by-election

2013 election

References

Camborne
Electoral divisions of Cornwall Council